Richard Richards may refer to:
 Sir Richard Richards (1752–1823), British judge and MP for Helston
 Richard Richards (1787–1860) (1787–1860), British MP for Merioneth
 Richard Meredyth Richards (1821–?), justice of the peace, and high sheriff for the county of Merionethshire
 Sir Richard Richards (Australian politician) (1863–1920), Lord Mayor of Sydney
 Richard W. Richards (1893–1985), Australian explorer with Ross Sea Party 1914–17, awarded the Albert Medal
 Richard Richards (Utah politician) (1932–2015), Republican candidate for US Representative from Utah; Chairman of Republican National Committee
 Richard N. Richards (born 1946), NASA astronaut
 Richard Richards (agronomist), winner of 2014 Rank Prize in Nutrition
 Rick Richards, guitarist

See also
 Dick Richards (disambiguation)